The Baeggu language (also called Baegu or Mbaenggu) is spoken by the indigenous people of the North Malaita Island in the Solomon Islands. In 1999 there were 5,900 people known to speak the language. The language is largely intelligible with Baelelea, To'aba'ita, and Lau.

See also
"Sweet Lullaby"

References

Malaita languages
Languages of the Solomon Islands